Epicauta rufidorsum is a species of beetle of the family Meloidae.

Adults feed on leaves and flowers of various herbaceous plants, whereas larvae feed on Acrididae eggs.

References

Beetles of Europe
Meloidae
Beetles described in 1777